The Law Society of England and Wales (officially The Law Society) is the professional association that represents solicitors for the jurisdiction of England and Wales. It provides services and support to practising and training solicitors, as well as serving as a sounding board for law reform. Members of the Society are often consulted when important issues are being debated in Parliament or by the executive. The Society was formed in 1825.

The Hall of The Law Society is in Chancery Lane, London, but it also has offices in Cardiff to deal with the Wales jurisdiction and the Senedd, and Brussels, to deal with European Union law.

A president is elected annually to serve for one year. The current president is Lubna Shuja, the first Asian and first Muslim president in the organisation's history.

The Law Society has nothing to do with barristers in England and Wales. The relevant professional body for barristers is the General Council of the Bar.

History

The London Law Institution, the predecessor to the Law Society, was founded in 1823 when many London Solicitors came together to raise the reputation of the profession by setting standards and ensuring good practice. 'London' was dropped from the title in 1825 to reflect the fact that the Law Institution had national aspirations.

The Society was founded on 2 June 1825, when a committee of management was appointed. The Society acquired its first Royal Charter in 1831 as The Society of Attorneys, Solicitors, Proctors and others not being Barristers, practising in the Courts of Law and Equity of the United Kingdom. A new Charter in 1845 defined the Society as an independent, private body servicing the affairs of the profession like other professional, literary and scientific bodies. By further Royal Charter in 1903 the name of the Society was changed to simply "The Law Society". The Society first admitted women members in 1922.

In July 2013, the Association of Women Solicitors (AWS), a national organisation working with and representing women solicitors in the United Kingdom, merged with the Law Society to form its Women Lawyers Division. Although merged, the AWS will operate separately from the Law Society.

Discipline
In 1834, the Society first initiated proceedings against dishonest practitioners. By 1907, the Society possessed a statutory disciplinary committee and was empowered to investigate solicitors' accounts and to issue annual practising certificates. In 1983, the Society established the Office for the Supervision of Solicitors to deal with complaints about solicitors. Complaints regarding the conduct of solicitors are now dealt with by the Solicitors Regulation Authority (SRA). However, complaints regarding poor service are the remit of the Legal Ombudsman.

Legal education
The Solicitors Act 1860 enabled the Society to create a three-tier examination system. In 1903, the Society established its own Law Society School of Law, which later merged with tutorial firm Gibson and Weldon to become the independent College of Law. By 1922 The Law Society required a compulsory academic year for all clerks.

Regulatory body status
Following the recommendations of the Clementi Review The Law Society split its representative and regulatory functions.

Complaints from the public are handled by the Legal Ombudsman which is a single portal for complaints by the public made against all providers of legal services including the Bar, licensed conveyancers etc., but excluding unqualified will-writers.

The regulatory body for solicitors is the Solicitors Regulation Authority. It is a Board of The Law Society although it regulates and enforces regulation completely independently of the Law Society. The Law Society remains the approved regulator, although following the Legal Services Act 2007 a new body, the Legal Services Board (currently chaired by Dr Helen Phillips) oversees all the approved regulators including the Bar Council, which has also divested its regulatory functions into the Bar Standards Board.

The Law Society of England and Wales is a Designated Professional Body under the Financial Services & Markets Act 2000.

The Hall of The Law Society
Located at 113 Chancery Lane The Hall of The Law Society is the principal building of the society. Built in 1832 the building is Grade II* listed. The architect was Lewis Vulliamy. An extension in 1902-04 was designed by Charles Holden. In addition to offices for its staff, the building is used for Law Society conferences and events and parts of the building are available on a private hire basis for events.

Past presidents

Standard Conditions of Sale
The "Standard Conditions of Sale" are issued by the Law Society to provide a standard set of rules and expectations for the sale and purchase of residential property in England and Wales. As a contractual instrument they are intended "to create legal rights and legal obligations" on the part of both parties to a transaction. The fifth (current) edition was initially published in 2011, and was revised in 2018. The majority of residential property sales are subject to these conditions.

See also
 Law Society Gazette
 Solicitors Regulation Authority
 Legal Complaints Service
 Law Society of Scotland
 Law Society of Northern Ireland
 Lexcel
 Cambridge University Law Society

References

External links
 

1825 establishments in the United Kingdom
Law societies
Legal organisations based in London
Lewis Vulliamy buildings
Organisations based in the City of Westminster
Organizations established in 1825
Legal regulators of the United Kingdom
Legal organisations based in Wales